Jiangdong Township is a township in Mangshi, Yunnan, China. It is surrounded by Wuchalu Township and Xuangang Township on the northwest, Hetou Township of Longling County on the east, and Mengyang Town of Lianghe County on the south.

Administrative division
As of December 2015, the township is divided into 8 villages: 
 Hetou
 Xianrendong
 Manglong
 Gaogengtian
 Hualachang
 Dashuijing
 Dashuigou
 Liziping

Geography

Economy
The local economy is primarily based upon agriculture and animal husbandry. The main cash crops are tea, grain and sugarcane.

Education
 Jiangdong Township Central Primary School
 Jiangdong Township Middle School

Transport
The County Road X024 passes across the township.

References

Divisions of Mangshi